Kassio is a given name. It may refer to:

 Kássio Nunes (born 1972), Brazilian magistrate
 Kassio (footballer, born 1987), Kassio Fernandes Magalhães, Brazilian football centre-back
 Kassio (footballer, born 1992), Kassio Fernando Rocha Martins, Brazilian football midfielder

See also
Cássio (disambiguation)